Willem Eduard Bok, Jr. (1 January 1880 in Pretoria, South African Republic – 29 October 1956 in Pretoria, Union of South Africa) was a South African lawyer, statesman and judge of Dutch descent.

Biography

Career

Bok studied law in England, before setting up a law practice in his home town of Pretoria. He was the private secretary of general Louis Botha. Later in life Bok became a justice of the Supreme Court of the Union of South Africa.

Family

Bok was the eldest son of Willem Eduard Bok (1846–1904), State Secretary of the South African Republic, and Martina Gerardina Johanna Eekhout (1856–1910).

He married in Pretoria 19 December 1907 with Maria Everdina Jacoba Kleyn (1880–1975), with whom he had four children.

References

Notes

Literature

1880 births
1956 deaths
People from Pretoria
South African people of Dutch descent
South African judges
20th-century South African lawyers
20th-century South African politicians